The men's 1000 metre sprint was one of seven track cycling events on the Cycling at the 1908 Summer Olympics programme. Its distance was the second shortest of the individual event distances. Each nation could enter up to 12 cyclists.

Background

This was the third appearance of the event, which has been held at every Summer Olympics except 1904 and 1912. None of the finalists from 1900 returned.

Canada, Great Britain, the Netherlands, South Africa, and Sweden each made their debut in the men's sprint. France and Germany made their third appearance, having competed in both previous editions of the event.

Competition format

The 1000 metre sprint race consisted of approximately 1  laps of the 660 yard track. The time limit for the race was 1 minute and 45 seconds. The competition was conducted in three rounds (quarterfinals, semifinals, and a final). The quarterfinals featured 16 heats, with up to 4 cyclists each. The winning cyclist in each heat advanced to the semifinals, provided that the time limit was not exceeded. The semifinal round comprised 4 semifinals, each with 4 cyclists except that 2 were reduced to 3 cyclists because two of the heats had resulted in no winner under the time limit. Again, the winning cyclist in each semifinal advanced to the final.

Records

The records for the sprint are 200 metre flying time trial records, kept for the qualifying round in later Games as well as for the finish of races.

* World records were not tracked by the UCI until 1954.

The 200 metre sprint splits were not tracked for this Games, so no new records were set.

Schedule

Results

Quarterfinals

Quarterfinal 1

Johnson won by two lengths.

Quarterfinal 2

Poulain was a wheel behind Venter.

Quarterfinal 3

Hansson was one length behind Schilles.

Quarterfinal 4

Flynn won by two lengths.

Quarterfinal 5

Nijland trailed Payne by a length and a half.

Quarterfinal 6

Quarterfinal 7

Neumer won by two lengths.

Quarterfinal 8

Cameron won by two lengths.

Quarterfinal 9

Morton was two and a half lengths behind Demangel.

Quarterfinal 10

Auffray was the only starter in the heat.

Quarterfinal 11

Morisetti was the only starter in the heat.

Quarterfinal 12

Marechal was one length behind Jones.

Quarterfinal 13

Summers was nearly two lengths behind Texier.

Quarterfinal 14

Lavery won easily.

Quarterfinal 15

Quarterfinal 16

Semifinals

Semifinal 1

Neumer was inches behind Johnson.

Semifinal 2

Payne was over a length behind Schilles; placement of the three non-qualifiers is unclear.

Semifinal 3

Jones won by half a wheel.

Semifinal 4

Morisetti was two lengths behind Kingsbury.

Final

Johnson suffered a punctured wheel shortly after the start, and retired. The other three riders crawled around the track, jockeying for position. When the final sprint occurred on the last lap, Kingsbury also punctured a tyre when entering the main straight. Jones and Schilles raced to the finish line, with Schilles winning by a couple of inches. However the race took longer than the 1 minute 45 second time limit, and was declared void. Much to the surprise of spectators and the competitors, the National Cyclists Union refused to allow the race to be rerun. According to the Official Report, "the Frenchman apparently won by inches, but the Judge did not officially place the riders."

Notes

Sources
 
 De Wael, Herman. Herman's Full Olympians: "Cycling 1908". Accessed 7 April 2006.

Men's sprint
Track cycling at the 1908 Summer Olympics
Cycling at the Summer Olympics – Men's sprint